Ramón De Zabalo Zubiaurre (10 June 1910 – 2 January 1967) was a British-born Spanish footballer who played for FC Barcelona in Spain and RC Paris in France. He represented Spain at the 1934 FIFA World Cup.

Honours
Barcelona
La Liga: 1944-45
Copa de Oro "Argentina": 1945
Copa Cataluña: 1930, 1931, 1932, 1935, 1936

RC Paris
Coupe de France: 1939-40

See also
List of Spain international footballers born outside Spain

References

External links
 Player profile at PlayerHistory.com 
 La Liga profile
 Profile
 

1910 births
1967 deaths
Footballers from South Shields
Spanish footballers
English footballers
British people of Basque descent
English people of Spanish descent
Association football defenders
Spain international footballers
Catalonia international footballers
1934 FIFA World Cup players
La Liga players
FC Barcelona players
Racing Club de France Football players
Ligue 1 players
Spanish expatriate footballers
English expatriate footballers
English expatriate sportspeople in France
Spanish expatriate sportspeople in France
Expatriate footballers in France
Footballers from Barcelona
English emigrants to Spain